Seyran Caferli (March 8, 1966) is a well-known Azerbaijani cartoonist. Over 700 of his cartoons have been printed in many albums and displayed at international exhibitions and competitions.

Early life 
Caferli was born in Imishli on March 8, 1966 as Seyran Nasirov. While he lived a hard life, he moved to Baku and began to express his emotions through caricatures.

Career 
In 2002, the first "Cartoonists Union of Azerbaijan" has established and till 2006 he worked as president of this organization. His first cartoon was printed in comic magazine “KIRPI” in 1982. He was graduated from Journalistic Art Institute in 1992. He was organizer of international cartoonist competition “Molla Nasreddin” which was the first competition in Azerbaijan history that continued 4 years. Caferli also organized“Smiling Cat“ International Cartoon Competitions. Now he is the director of First International Cartoon News Center "CNC" (http://www.cartooncenter.net) web-site and chief-editor “Humor” international cartoon magazine.

He is also the Azerbaijan-Editor of the “WITTY WORLD” International Cartoon magazine, published in the United States. Member of board FICWS (Federation of International Cartoon Web Sites) & vise-president (FICA) Federation of International Cartoon & Animation. He is a board member of International Cartoon Committee. Seyran Caferli was part as member of jury in more than 20 international cartoon competitions. In international cartoon competitions, he awarded prizes, first, second, third places, gold, silver and bronze medals, including more than 100 awards. His 2 cartoons were included as permanent exhibit in Italy and Austria cartoon museums. He opened individual exhibitions in Iran (2003), in Turkey (2011) and in France (2012).

He is head of Azerbaijan representation in World Cartoonists union.

2 of his cartoons were selected as permanent exhibit in Mercedes Benz headquarters. One of his works selected at 'Biennale Internazionale dell'Umorismo nell'arte' cartoon contest and kept in a museum in Tolentino, Italy.

Also his book including 50 cartoons of him, were published in Kruishoutem, Belgium by ECC (European Cartoon Center).

Family 
Seyran Caferli married and had one son, Ibrahim Nasirli,a DJ and record producer known as Austin Blake (Part of BakuBoy & Austin Blake).

See also 
 List of caricaturists

References 

 Biography of Seyran Caferli
 Biography of Seyran Caferli and his prizes
 Azerbaijani cartoonist to participate in International Animation and Cartoon Forum, 06.09.2011
 Interview, Dessinateur de presse en Azerbaпdjan
 Interview, Francisco Punal Suarez, CNN. December 17,2010

External links
 Official Facebook Page
 CWN News
 Seyran Caferli on Best Cartoons
 Seyran Caferli on ToonPool

1966 births
Living people
Azerbaijani artists
People from Imishli